Mody Maor (born 27 June 1985) is an Israeli-American professional basketball coach who currently serves as head coach for the New Zealand Breakers of the Australian National Basketball League.

Coaching career

On May 11, 2022, New Zealand Breakers head coach Dan Shamir resigned, with assistant Maor being named as his replacement later that day.

References

External links 

1985 births
Living people
Hapoel Jerusalem B.C. coaches
Israeli basketball coaches
Jewish Israeli sportspeople
New Zealand Breakers coaches